al-'Azi is an Arab village in Israel. Located just south of Kfar Menahem, it falls under the jurisdiction of Yoav Regional Council.

The village was officially recognized in 2003 but existed long before then. The Trans-Israel Highway was built on land owned by the village, with the village given land owned by neighbouring kibbutz Kfar Menahem as compensation.

See also
Arab localities in Israel

References

Arab villages in Israel
Populated places in Southern District (Israel)
2003 establishments in Israel